A Royal Night Out is a 2015 British romantic comedy-drama film directed by Julian Jarrold and written by Trevor de Silva and Kevin Hood. The film stars Sarah Gadon as the teenaged Princess Elizabeth, who, with younger sister Princess Margaret (Bel Powley), ventures out of Buckingham Palace to enjoy the VE Day celebrations.

Plot
On VE Day – 8 May 1945 – as London celebrates the end of World War II in Europe and peace being declared across the continent, Princesses Elizabeth and Margaret are allowed to join the celebrations, against the Queen's wishes. The King, impressed by Elizabeth's pleading, asks her to report back on the people's feelings towards him and his midnight speech on the radio.

Each girl, incognito, is chaperoned by an army officer with an itinerary to be back at Buckingham Palace by 1 a.m. Soon realising the Queen's planned itinerary does not fulfil their expectations of fun and meeting the ordinary people, Margaret is the first to slip away from her escort, followed by Elizabeth.

The princesses are separated on two different buses. Margaret is befriended by a naval officer seeking to take advantage of what he believes is just an ordinary girl, and Elizabeth by an airman who is absent without leave.

Margaret is led by her naval officer into a world of nightclubs, gambling, spiked drinks and brothels. Elizabeth and her airman have their own adventures trying to catch up with Margaret, which take them far beyond the 1 a.m. deadline into the early hours of the following morning.

Cast

The character of Pryce is credited as a Lieutenant, but is shown as, and referred to as, Captain Pryce throughout the film.

Relation to actual events
The two officer escorts and the airman in the screenplay were fictional creations. In reality, the princesses in an organised group of 16 went out at 10 p.m. to mingle with revellers, and returned to Buckingham Palace at 1 a.m.

Release
A Royal Night Out was released in the United Kingdom on 8 May 2015 and on DVD on 7 September 2015. The film was released in the United States on 4 December 2015 and released on DVD on 3 May 2016.

Critical reception
On Rotten Tomatoes, the film has a 74% approval rate of critics based on 73 reviews, with an average quality rating of 5.8/10. The site's consensus states: "Undeniably slight yet thoroughly charming, A Royal Night Out uses a fascinating historical footnote as a springboard into a fun dramedy diversion." Metacritic reports a 58 out of 100 rating, based on 17 critics, indicating "mixed or average reviews".

References

External links
 
 
 
 
 

2015 films
2010s historical comedy-drama films
2015 romantic comedy-drama films
2010s historical romance films
British historical comedy-drama films
British romantic comedy-drama films
Cultural depictions of George VI
Films about Elizabeth II
Films directed by Julian Jarrold
Films set in 1945
Films set in England
Films set in London
Films shot in Brussels
Films shot in Derbyshire
Films shot in Yorkshire
British historical romance films
Biographical films about British royalty
Lionsgate films
2010s English-language films
2010s British films